Punithavathi is a 1963 Indian Tamil language film directed by M. R. Vittal. The film stars R. S. Manohar and Pandari Bai.

Plot

Cast 

Male cast
R. S. Manohar
K. Sarangapani
Kaka Radhakrishnan
Vadhiraj
Dhasarathan
Raghavan
Maali

Female cast
Pandari Bai
Kamatchi
Bombay Meenakshi
Chellam

Production 
The film was produced by C. T. Chettiar under the banner Sri Sathya Narayana Pictures and was directed by M. R. Vittal. Screenplay and dialogues were penned by Sri Sathya Narayana.

Soundtrack 
Music was composed by Hussein Reddy and the lyrics were penned by Surabhi, Suratha, A. L. Narayanan and Subbu Arumugam.

References

External links 
 

1960s Tamil-language films